Thiotricha aucupatrix is a moth of the family Gelechiidae. It was described by Edward Meyrick in 1929. It is found in Peru.

The wingspan is about 8 mm. The forewings are silvery white with a very oblique blackish line from the costa at two-thirds, and a fine dark fuscous line from the anterior extremity of a dash on the end of the fold, converging to a round black apical dot. The hindwings are rather dark grey.

References

Moths described in 1929
Thiotricha
Taxa named by Edward Meyrick